The Marlborough Fault System is a set of four large dextral strike-slip faults and other related structures in the northern part of South Island, New Zealand, which transfer displacement between the mainly transform plate boundary of the Alpine fault and the mainly destructive boundary of the Kermadec Trench, and together form the boundary between the Australian and Pacific Plates.

Geometry
The Marlborough Fault System consists of four main dominantly strike-slip fault strands, which together carry almost all of the displacement associated with the plate boundary. Other smaller faults form as splays of these main faults or accommodate deformation of the crust between them, such as the Newton and Hura Faults at the western end of the Hope Fault and the Jordan Thrust that formed the Seaward Kaikoura Range. The dextral strike-slip across this zone has also involved clockwise rotation of the intervening fault blocks of about 20° since the early Pliocene.

Development
The Marlborough Fault System formed at about 5 Ma, during the early Pliocene, in response to a change in plate motions. The new plate vector was significantly oblique to the Alpine Fault, causing an increased amount of convergence. The set of strike-slip faults formed to accommodate this change by taking up most of the strike-slip component.

Faults
There are four main fault strands, although many other smaller faults, of either strike-slip or thrust type are known.

Main Faults

Hope Fault

The Hope Fault forms the southernmost part of the Marlborough Fault System. The estimated slip-rate during the Holocene is 20–25 mm/yr, just over half of the plate boundary displacement. At its northeastern end it links into the Jordan Thrust and most of the displacement is transferred onto that structure. It takes its name from the Hope River, which runs along one of the central fault segments. The Kekerengu Fault and Jordan Thrust are closely associated with the Hope Fault.

Clarence Fault

The Clarence Fault runs from close to the Alpine Fault to about 10 km west of Ward, where it appears to terminate abruptly. A Holocene slip-rate of 3.5–5.0 mm/yr is estimated for this fault. At the surface the displacement appears to be nearly pure horizontal, but continuous uplift of the neighbouring Inner Kaikoura Range over the same period, suggests that some of the dip-slip component thought to be present at depth on the fault zone is transferred onto thrust or reverse faults under the range. An extra 10° of clockwise rotation has been recognised within the block that lies northeast of the tip of the Clarence fault. It takes its name from the Waiau Toa / Clarence River, which follows the fault trace in the northeastern section of the fault.

Awatere Fault

It is formed of two main segments; the Molesworth section to the southwest and the Eastern section to the northeast. The estimated recent slip-rate for the Molesworth section is 4.4 mm/yr. It takes its name from the Awatere River whose valley follows the fault trace along some of its length.

Wairau Fault

The Wairau Fault is sometimes regarded as a direct continuation of the Alpine Fault and may be referred to as the Alpine-Wairau Fault. It takes its name from the Wairau River, which follows the fault trace for most of its length. It has an estimated slip-rate of 3–5 mm/yr.

Smaller Faults

Kekerengu Fault

It is closely associated with the Hope Fault and Jordan Thrust at its south-easternmost edge and likely joins with the Clarence Fault to form the Wairarapa Fault offshore in Cook Strait. Before joining with the Clarence Fault, The offshore segment of the Kekerengu Fault is known as the Needles Fault. Both the Kekerengu Fault and the Needles Fault ruptured in the 7.8 2016 Kaikoura earthquake.

Elliott Fault
The Elliott Fault branches from the central portion of the Clarence Fault and then rejoins it.

Kelly Fault
The Kelly Fault forms a major fork of the Hope Fault from just west of Harper Pass; it forks again to the west into the Newton and Hura faults just before connecting to the Alpine Fault.

Jordan Thrust
The Jordan Thrust is a reverse fault that connects the southern end of the Kekerengu Fault to the Seaward Segment of the Hope Fault.

Seismicity
All parts of the Marlborough Fault System are currently seismically active. Historical earthquakes (since European settlement) have occurred on both the Hope and Awatere Faults and on the smaller Poulter Fault. Studies of the geomorphology and the use of trenching across fault strands, has identified many earthquakes that occurred during the Holocene on many parts of the fault system. The Hope Fault, which has the fastest slip rate is characterised by the shortest recurrence interval.

See also
1848 Marlborough earthquake
2013 Seddon earthquake
2013 Lake Grassmere earthquake
2016 Kaikoura earthquake
List of earthquakes in New Zealand

References

Seismic faults of New Zealand
Geographic areas of seismological interest